Andrea Benvenuti (born 13 December 1969 in Negrar, Verona) is an Italian former 800 metres runner.

Biography
He won the gold medal at the 1994 European Championships in Helsinki. Previously, he had come fifth in the 1992 Olympic final and third in the World Cup 1992.  He represented his country at the 1993 World Championships in Athletics.

He is the Italian record holder of the 1000 metres with the time of 2:15.76.
His personal best in 800 metres is 1:43.92. He is a two-time national champion at the Italian Athletics Championships. After his retirement, he was entered into the FIDAL Hall of Fame.

International competitions

National titles
Italian Athletics Championships
800 m outdoor: 1992
800 m indoor: 1991

See also
 Italian all-time lists - 800 metres

References

External links
 

1969 births
Living people
Italian male middle-distance runners
Olympic athletes of Italy
Athletes (track and field) at the 1992 Summer Olympics
Athletes (track and field) at the 1996 Summer Olympics
Sportspeople from the Province of Verona
European Athletics Championships medalists
World Athletics Championships athletes for Italy